Gav Zaban (also Romanized as Gāv Zabān) is a village in Kuhin Rural District, in the Central District of Kabudarahang County, Hamadan Province, Iran. At the 2006 census, its population was 466, in 92 families.

References 

Populated places in Kabudarahang County